The Chatfield Trail is a 4.6-mile Blue-Blazed hiking trail located within the town of Killingworth, Connecticut.

The northern trailhead is directly across from Chatfield Hollow State Park on Route 80. There is a good parking area outside the park's entrance. The trailhead is well marked on the South side of Route 80 just across the street from the park's entrance. The one-way route is 4.6 miles to the southern trailhead on River Road though there is also a 0.75-mile alternate trail that loops off the main trail. 

There is also a second northern trailhead entrance that is located on the south side of Route 80, about 0.3 miles west of the park entrance where there is a rough pullover area for 4 or 5 cars. From this old trailhead you can take a short 0.1-mile Blue and White trail east to the Blue-Blaze trail. 

The northern section of the trail is located within Cockaponset State Forest.  The southern sections of the trail pass near Deer Lake Camp and through privately owned property ending at River Road, just west of the intersection of Papermill Road and River Road. River Road has a small pullover for 1 or 2 cars that can be used to access the southern trailhead.

References

Further reading

 

Killingworth, Connecticut
Hiking trails in Connecticut
Protected areas of Middlesex County, Connecticut
Blue-Blazed Trails